Scion, a former marque of the automotive conglomerate Toyota, sold eight different small car models during its thirteen year existence in the North American market. All of its vehicles were mechanically related to or outright rebadgings of other cars sold under the Toyota brand.

See also 

 Scion, the marque under which these vehicles were sold
 compact and subcompact cars, the types of vehicles which Scion sold
 List of Toyota vehicles, for a complete list of vehicles made by the Toyota Group

Scion vehicles